Brown Book is an album by Death in June, released in 1987.

"To Drown A Rose" was released as a 10" single, backed with non-album tracks "Europa: The Gates of Heaven" and "Zimmerit". This single was later re-released as part of the 1989 compilation The Corn Years. The song features Rose McDowall on lead vocals.

The album is named after an index of West Germans who were previously involved in Germany's National Socialist government, compiled by East German authorities and published in 1965. Numerous songs on the album make extensive use of quotations from literature, including Jean Genet's 1948 novel Funeral Rites ("To Drown a Rose", "The Fog of the World"), and Yukio Mishima's 1969 novel Spring Snow ("Touch Defiles").

The sale of Brown Book has been prohibited in Germany since 2005 due to the title track's sampling of the "Horst-Wessel-Lied", the anthem of the Sturmabteilung. In response to the proposed ban, Douglas P. submitted statements to the German authorities explaining large passages of his work, including noting that the sample of "Horst-Wessel-Lied" was juxtaposed against samples from the film The World that Summer. The samples in question included that of a Jewish grandmother describing her "suicidal fatalism", and homophobic statements from her lover, an SA officer.

Track listing

Personnel 

 Composed by: Death in June, John Balance (track B2)
 Featuring: Bee, David Tibet (as "Tibet 93"), Gary Carey, Iain O'Higgins (as "Jan O'"), Ian Read, John Balance, Rose McDowall
 Performer: Douglas P.

References

1987 albums
Death in June albums